Michael Schoenhals (born 1953) is a Swedish sinologist, specializing in the society of modern China. He is Professor Emeritus of Chinese Studies at Lund University.

The book Mao's Last Revolution by Roderick MacFarquhar and Michael Schoenhals is considered the seminal work on the Cultural Revolution.

Selected bibliography
 Saltationist Socialism: Mao Zedong and the Great Leap Forward 1958 (1987)
 Doing Things with Words in Chinese Politics: Five Studies (1992)
 China's Cultural Revolution, 1966-1969: Not a Dinner Party (1996)
 "The Central Case Examination Group, 1966-79." China Quarterly, no. 145 (1996): 87-111.
 Mao's Last Revolution (2006) with Roderick MacFarquhar
 Spying for the People: Mao's Secret Agents, 1949-1967 (2012)

References

External links 
Schoenhals's web page, at Lund University

Swedish sinologists
20th-century Swedish historians
1953 births
Living people
21st-century Swedish historians
Academic staff of Lund University
Historians of the Cultural Revolution